New Juke Box Hits is the fifth studio album by rock and roll pioneer Chuck Berry, released in March 1961 by Chess Records. Unlike his previous four LPs, only two songs, "Little Star" backed with "I'm Talking About You", had been previously released on a 45 rpm single. 

The album was recorded and released while Berry was in the midst of legal difficulties, which led to his imprisonment in 1962. The adverse  publicity from these legal problems affected sales of his records, and the previous single failed to reach the Billboard Hot 100 chart. Berry did not release another album of songs for over three years.

Legacy
William Ruhlmann in a retrospective review for AllMusic, feels that the distractions of his legal problems inhibited Berry, so the songs on this album compare unfavourably with his earlier albums.

Track listing
All tracks composed by Chuck Berry except as noted.

Side one
 "I'm Talking About You" – 1:46
 "Diploma for Two" – 2:28
 "Thirteen Question Method" – 2:12
 "Away from You" – 2:38
 "Don't You Lie to Me" (Hudson Whittaker) – 2:02
 "The Way It Was Before" – 2:52

Side two
 "Little Star" – 2:45
 "Route 66" (Bobby Troup) – 2:45
 "Sweet Sixteen" (Joe Josea, B.B. King) – 2:45
 "Run Around" – 2:31
 "Stop and Listen" – 2:26
 "Rip It Up" (John Marascalco, Robert Blackwell) – 1:57

Personnel
 Chuck Berry – vocals, guitars
 Johnnie Johnson – piano
 Reggie Boyd – bass
 Fred Below, Jaspar Thomas – drums
 Leroy C. Davis – tenor saxophone

References

External links

Chuck Berry albums
1961 albums
Chess Records albums
Albums produced by Leonard Chess
Albums produced by Phil Chess